DeKaylin Zecharius "DK" Metcalf (born December 14, 1997) is an American football wide receiver for the Seattle Seahawks of the National Football League (NFL). He played college football at Ole Miss. He is the son of former NFL guard Terrence Metcalf.

Metcalf was born and raised in Oxford, Mississippi, where he played football both at Oxford High School and at the University of Mississippi, also known as Ole Miss. He played at Ole Miss for three seasons before declaring for the 2019 NFL Draft, where he was selected by the Seahawks in the second round.

Early years
Metcalf was born on December 14, 1997, in Oxford, Mississippi. He attended Oxford High School in Oxford, Mississippi. During his high school football career, he had 224 receptions for 3,302 yards and 49 touchdowns. Regarded as a four-star prospect, Metcalf was ranked the No. 14 wide receiver prospect by Rivals.com. He committed to play college football at the University of Mississippi.

College career
As a freshman at Ole Miss in 2016, Metcalf appeared in the first two games of the season before suffering a foot injury which ended his season. He was granted a redshirt following his injury. He had two receptions for 13 yards with both of the receptions going for touchdowns. In 2017, he had 39 receptions for 646 yards and seven touchdowns.  During the 2018 season, Metcalf had 26 receptions for 569 yards before sustaining a season-ending neck injury against Arkansas. After his 2018 season, Metcalf declared for the 2019 NFL Draft, forgoing his last two years of college football. He finished his career with 67 receptions for 1,228 yards and 14 touchdowns.

College statistics

Professional career

2019
Metcalf was selected by the Seattle Seahawks in the second round as the 64th overall pick in the 2019 NFL Draft, the ninth of 28 wide receivers. On May 22, 2019, Metcalf signed a four-year deal with the Seahawks worth $4.6 million.

Metcalf played his first regular season game on September 8, 2019, against the Cincinnati Bengals, where he made four receptions for 89 receiving yards as the Seahawks won 21–20. This set a franchise record for total receiving yards by a player making his NFL debut, eclipsing Hall of Famer Steve Largent's previous record of 86 yards. In Week 2 against the Pittsburgh Steelers, Metcalf caught three passes for 61 yards, including his first career touchdown, as the Seahawks won 28–26. In Week 8 against the Atlanta Falcons, Metcalf recorded three catches for 13 yards and two touchdowns in the 27–20 win, Metcalf's first career game with multiple touchdowns. The following week against the Tampa Bay Buccaneers, Metcalf set new career highs in receptions and receiving yards, with six catches for 124 yards, including a 53-yard touchdown in the final minutes of the fourth quarter and a 29-yard catch on 3rd down in overtime that set up a game winning touchdown a few plays later. It was his first career 100-yard game. He also caught a two-point conversion that tied the game at 21 in the third quarter. Metcalf finished the regular season with 900 receiving yards (third among NFL rookies) on 58 receptions with seven receiving touchdowns, second on the team in all three categories to Tyler Lockett. Metcalf was ranked 81st by his fellow players on the NFL Top 100 Players of 2020.

In the Wild Card Round against the Philadelphia Eagles, Metcalf recorded seven catches for 160 yards and a touchdown in the Seahawks' 17–9 victory. This set the NFL record for most receiving yards by a rookie in a playoff game.

2020

In Week 1 against the Atlanta Falcons, Metcalf caught 4 passes for 95 yards, including a 38-yard touchdown reception, during the 38–25 win. In the following week's game against the New England Patriots, Metcalf caught four passes for 92 yards and a 54-yard touchdown during the 35–30 win.

In the first quarter of the Week 3 game against the Dallas Cowboys, after catching a 61-yard pass, Metcalf slowed to a jog and held the ball out with one hand, seemingly unaware that a defender was behind him. Trevon Diggs knocked the ball free of Metcalf's grasp before he broke the plane of the endzone, and the fumble traveled out of bounds for a touchback. The gaffe was compared to Leon Lett's infamous fumble in Super Bowl XXVII. Despite the blunder, the Seahawks won the game 38–31. Metcalf finished with 110 receiving yards, including the 29-yard game-winning touchdown. In Week 4 against the Miami Dolphins, he had four receptions for 106 yards in the 31–23 victory.

In Week 5 against the Minnesota Vikings on Sunday Night Football, Metcalf recorded six catches for 93 yards and two touchdowns, including the game-winning touchdown reception with 15 seconds left in the game, during the 27–26 win.

In Week 7 against the Arizona Cardinals, Cardinals' safety Budda Baker intercepted a Russell Wilson pass inside the Cardinals' 5-yard-line, and with a clear path ahead and no Seahawk with comparable speed near him, Baker appeared destined for a pick six. However, even though the 195 lb Baker had a 4-yard running head-start halfway across the field, the 229 lb. Metcalf chased down Baker and tackled him at the Seattle 8-yard line, preventing a touchdown. On their ensuing possession, Arizona failed to score, turning the ball over on downs after an incomplete pass from the 3-yard line. Metcalf reached a top speed of 22.64 mph (36.43 km/h), making it the second-fastest in pursuit in the NFL to that point in the season. Ironically, the play was also compared to Leon Lett's Super Bowl XXVII gaffe, yet this time in a far more favorable light. The play was met with awe by fans and athletes alike, and became the basis for a popular meme on social media.

In Week 8 against the San Francisco 49ers, Metcalf caught 12 receptions on 15 targets for 161 yards and two touchdowns, including a 46-yard touchdown catch-and-run during the 37–27 win. In Week 12 against the Philadelphia Eagles on Monday Night Football, he had ten receptions for a career-high 177 receiving yards during the 23–17 win.

Metcalf finished the season with 1,303 receiving yards and 10 touchdowns. With 1,303 receiving yards, Metcalf set the franchise record for the Seahawks, surpassing Steve Largent's record from 35 years prior. He was named a second-team All-Pro in 2020 alongside Bobby Wagner and Jamal Adams as the other Seahawk All-Pros.

In the Wild Card Round of the playoffs against the Los Angeles Rams, Metcalf recorded five receptions for 96 yards and two touchdowns, including a 51-yard touchdown reception, during the 30–20 loss.

Metcalf was ranked 22nd on the NFL Top 100 Players of 2021 for his performance during the 2020 season.

2021
Earlier in the year before the start of the NFL season, he participated in the 100 meter part of the USATF Golden Games and Distance Open in Walnut, California. He hoped to qualify for the Olympic trials with this performance. Though he indeed didn't qualify, he had a "respectable" time of 10.37 seconds, beating out 2 of the 17 other competitors.

In Week 3 of the 2021 season, Metcalf hauled in 6 receptions for 107 yards in a 17–30 loss against the Minnesota Vikings. Two weeks later, he recorded 5 catches and 98 receiving yards for 2 touchdowns against the Seattle Seahawks' division rival Los Angeles Rams. Despite his efforts, the Seahawks lost 17–26 in the “Thursday Night Football” matchup.

In another primetime matchup with Week 7's Sunday Night Football game against the New Orleans Saints, Metcalf caught 2 passes for 96 yards and a touchdown. On one of these catches, Metcalf connected with quarterback Geno Smith for an 84-yard touchdown catch-and-run, with 57 yards coming after the catch. The play was the longest in both Smith and Metcalf's careers. In addition, Metcalf clocked in at a top speed of 21.21 mph, making it the second-fastest play of his career as a ball-carrier. The Seahawks lost the game, 10–13. In the following week's game against the Jacksonville Jaguars, Metcalf finished with 6 receptions for 43 yards and 2 touchdowns as the Seahawks won 31–7.

In the Seahawks’ Week 10 game at Green Bay, Metcalf grabbed the face masks of Green Bay Packers safety Henry Black and cornerback Eric Stokes in a frustrated response to Seattle's inability to score points in the game. He was ejected and tried to enter back into the game, but to no avail. In a shutout, the Seahawks lost 0–17.

In Week 16, Metcalf caught six receptions for 63 yards and a career-high three touchdowns, contributing 18 points in a blowout 51–29 win against the Detroit Lions.

With a final record of 7–10, the Seahawks failed to reach the playoffs for the first time in Metcalf's career. Metcalf finished the season just 33 yards shy of the 1,000 receiving yards mark, with 967 yards. He recorded a total of 75 receptions and 12 touchdowns, the latter of which was a career-high. He led the Seahawks in receptions and receiving touchdowns, while his receiving yards were second to Tyler Lockett. The season was also his last with quarterback Russell Wilson, who was traded to the Denver Broncos the following offseason.

2022
On July 28, 2022, Metcalf and the Seahawks agreed to terms on a three-year, $72 million extension with $58.2 million guaranteed and a $30 million signing bonus. In Week 4, against the Detroit Lions, he had seven receptions for 149 receiving yards in the 48–45 victory. During the Wild Card Round against the San Francisco 49ers, DK Metcalf had ten receptions for 136 receiving yards and two touchdowns in a 41–23 loss.

NFL career statistics

Regular season

Postseason

NFL records
Most receiving yards by a rookie in a playoff game: (160 vs. Philadelphia Eagles on January 5, 2020, in the Wild Card Round)

Seahawks records
Most receiving yards in rookie debut: (89 vs. Cincinnati Bengals on September 8, 2019)
Most yards in a season: 1,303 (2020)

Personal life
Metcalf's father, Terrence, was an offensive lineman in the NFL.

After ESPN announcer Joe Tessitore mistakenly called him "Decaf Metcalf", Metcalf partnered with Volcanica Coffee. Beginning in December 2019, 16-ounce bags of coffee labeled "Decaf Metcalf" began selling on the company's website. Part of the proceeds from the coffee sales will be donated to Prison Fellowship, an organization Metcalf has a long-standing relationship with.

Metcalf is a born-again Christian.

On February 17, 2023, Metcalf played in the NBA All-Star Weekend Celebrity Game. Metcalf shot 9 of 16 and finished with 20 points, 10 rebounds and four blocks. He also had some emphatic dunks in the 81-78 victory. This performance earned him the Most Valuable Player award for the game.

References

External links
 
Collegiate statistics at Sports-Reference.com
Ole Miss Rebels bio
Seattle Seahawks bio

1997 births
Living people
African-American Christians
African-American players of American football
American Christians
American football wide receivers
National Conference Pro Bowl players
Ole Miss Rebels football players
Players of American football from Mississippi
Players of American football from Seattle
Seattle Seahawks players
Sportspeople from Oxford, Mississippi